Ricardo Andrés Monasterio Guimaraes (born October 22, 1978) is a former competition swimmer who represented Venezuela at the 1996, 2000, 2004 and 2008 Summer Olympics.

Monasterio was born in Caracas, Venezuela.  He attended the University of Florida in Gainesville, Florida, where he swam for coach Gregg Troy's Florida Gators swimming and diving team in National Collegiate Athletic Association (NCAA) competition from 1999 to 2001.  He received four All-American honors while swimming for the Gators.  Monasterio graduated from the University of Florida with a bachelor's degree in statistics in 2004.

Monasterio won the 200-meter and 400-meter freestyle events at the 2003 Pan American Games.

See also 

 List of University of Florida alumni
 List of University of Florida Olympians
 South American records in swimming

References

External links 

  Ricardo Monasterio – University of Florida athlete profile at GatorZone.com

1978 births
Living people
Florida Gators men's swimmers
Venezuelan male freestyle swimmers
Olympic swimmers of Venezuela
Sportspeople from Caracas
Swimmers at the 1996 Summer Olympics
Swimmers at the 1999 Pan American Games
Swimmers at the 2000 Summer Olympics
Swimmers at the 2003 Pan American Games
Swimmers at the 2004 Summer Olympics
Swimmers at the 2007 Pan American Games
Swimmers at the 2008 Summer Olympics
Swimmers at the 2011 Pan American Games
Pan American Games gold medalists for Venezuela
Pan American Games silver medalists for Venezuela
Pan American Games bronze medalists for Venezuela
Pan American Games medalists in swimming
Central American and Caribbean Games gold medalists for Venezuela
Competitors at the 1998 Central American and Caribbean Games
Competitors at the 2002 Central American and Caribbean Games
Competitors at the 2006 Central American and Caribbean Games
Central American and Caribbean Games medalists in swimming
Medalists at the 1999 Pan American Games
Medalists at the 2003 Pan American Games
Medalists at the 2007 Pan American Games
Medalists at the 2011 Pan American Games
20th-century Venezuelan people
21st-century Venezuelan people